Snaggletooth may refer to:

"Snaggletooth", a 1984 song by English rock band Motörhead from No Remorse
Snaggletooth a.k.a. Warpig, the mascot of English rock band Motörhead
Snivvian (a.k.a. Snaggletooth), a character seen in Star Wars Episode IV: A New Hope, as known as Zutton
Snaggletooth (fish), predatory fish of the genus Astronesthes
Snaggletooth shark, Hemipristis elongatus, is a species of weasel shark, family Hemigaleidae, and the only extant member of the genus Hemipristis
Snagglepuss, originally known as "Snaggletooth", a Hanna-Barbera cartoon character